A No-Hit No-Run Summer is a Canadian sports drama film, directed by Francis Leclerc and released in 2008.

Written by Marc Robitaille as an adaptation of his own novel, the film is set in the late 1960s and stars Pier-Luc Funk as Martin, a young boy who loves baseball and dreams of someday playing for the new Montreal Expos. He is disappointed when he is not chosen for the local youth baseball team by coach Gilbert Turcotte (Roy Dupuis), but his hope is restored when his father Charles (Patrice Robitaille) decides to organize and coach a new baseball team for the kids who didn't make it onto Turcotte's team.

The film received two Prix Jutra nominations at the 11th Jutra Awards in 2009, for Best Editing (Glenn Berman) and Best Original Music (Carl Bastien, Luc Sicard).

Cast
Patrice Robitaille as Charles 
Pier-Luc Funk as Martin 
Jacinthe Laguë as Mireille 
Roy Dupuis as Gilbert Turcotte 
Peter Batakliev as Monsieur B 
Frédérique Dufort as Sophie 
Phillip Jarrett as Mack Jones 
Guy-Daniel Tremblay as Fern 
Guy Thauvette as M. Audet 
Victor Desjardins as Grand Pete

Music
In addition to Fernand Lapierre's recording of the Montreal Expos theme song "Les Expos sont là", the film's soundtrack included a number of popular French and English songs from the era. Most were rerecorded as new covers by contemporary Quebec artists, although Robert Charlebois and Louise Forestier's "Lindberg" was included in its original version, and a few songs, including the theme to the television sitcom Gilligan's Island, were sung diegetically by the film's own cast.

"Je reviens chez nous" (Jean-Pierre Ferland) - Fernand Lapierre
"Les Expos sont là" (Marc Gélinas, Marcel Lefebvre) - Fernand Lapierre
"L'amour est bleu" (André Popp, Pierre Cour) - Luc Sicard and Carl Bastien
"People Got to Be Free" (Felix Cavaliere, Eddie Brigati) - Louis Larivière
"Working for the Man" (Roy Orbison) - Luck Mervil
"Daydream" (John Sebastian) - Ariane Moffatt
"The Ballad of Gilligan's Isle" (George Wyle, Sherwood Schwartz) - Pier-Luc Funk, Victor Desjardins, Simon Pigeon, Jean Carl Boucher
"California Dreamin'" (John Phillips, Michelle Philips) - Luck Mervil, Daniel Bélanger, Ariane Moffatt, Marie-Pierre Arthur
"Sunshine Superman" (Donovan) - Daniel Bélanger
"These Eyes" (Randy Bachman, Burton Cummings) - Béatrice Bonifassi
"Lindberg" (Robert Charlebois, Claude Péloquin) - Robert Charlebois, Louise Forestier
"The House of the Rising Sun" (Alan Price) - Sandrine St-Onge, Frédérique Dufort

References

External links
 

2008 films
2000s coming-of-age drama films
Canadian baseball films
Canadian coming-of-age drama films
2008 drama films
Films shot in Quebec
Films directed by Francis Leclerc
Films based on Canadian novels
French-language Canadian films
2000s Canadian films
2000s French-language films